Thalassobathia is a genus of deep-sea viviparous brotulas.

Species
There are currently two recognized species in this genus:
 Thalassobathia nelsoni R. S. Lee, 1974
 Thalassobathia pelagica Cohen, 1963

References

Bythitidae